Koji Yamamoto may refer to:

 Koji Yamamoto (actor) (born 1976), Japanese actor
 Koji Yamamoto (baseball, born 1946), former Japanese All-Star baseball player
 Koji Yamamoto (basketball) (1952–2001), Japanese Olympic basketball player
 Koji Yamamoto (baseball, born 1951) (1951–2016), former Japanese professional baseball player